Satra, Sätra or SATRA may refer to:

SATRA, a research and technology centre formerly known as the Shoe and Allied Trade Research Association
Sätra, a suburb of Stockholm, Sweden
Satra, a trading company from the former Soviet Union
Satra (Ekasarana Dharma), religious institutions in the Ekasarana Dharma sub-tradition of Vaishnavism